Bavor may refer to:
 Bavor Rodovský mladší of Hustiřany, Czech nobleman and alchemist
 Bavor II, feudal ruler of Strakonice, Bohemia and Castellan of royal castle Zvíkov

See also 

 Bavors